Proto-Hlai is the reconstructed ancestor of the Hlai languages. Proto-Hlai reconstructions include those of Matisoff (1988), Thurgood (1991), Wu (2000), Ostapirat (2004), and Norquest (2007).

Phonology
Peter K. Norquest (2007) reconstructs 29 basic Proto-Hlai consonants (Norquest 2007:135), while Weera Ostapirat reconstructs only 19 proto-consonants (Ostapirat 2007:145).

Norquest additionally reconstructs six onsets suggesting consonant clusters: . Whether these were actual consonant clusters is not clear. The clusters with a glide as a second member may have been coarticulated consonants: palatalized , labialized , while *pl may have arisen from a sesquisyllable *p-l.

Norquest also reconstructs six bisyllabic root shapes:
 *Ci + glottal: *Ciʔ-, *Ciɦ-
 *Cu + glottal: *Cuʔ-, *Cuɦ-
 *Cu + rhotic: *Cuɾ-, *Cur-
Pretonic syllables are later lost in all Hlai languages, but in these six combinations, they trigger in some languages conditional developments of the tonic syllable's onset consonant, allowing them to be distinguished in reconstruction.

In Ostapirat's (2004) reconstruction, Proto-Hlai forms can be both monosyllabic and disyllabic. Some disyllabic forms have medial consonants beginning with three penultimate vowels (*u-, *i-, *a-; the last of which is default). Vowels can also combine with *-i or *-u to form diphthongs. Tones (*A, *B, *C, *D) are also reconstructed.

In the table below, Proto-Hlai consonants marked as green can occur at the end of syllables.

Ostapirat (2004) reconstructs 5 vowels, which are /a, ə, i, ɨ, u/. Norquest reconstructs seven vowel qualities (Norquest 2007:238, 330).

Sound changes

The transition from Pre-Hlai (the predecessor of the Proto-Hlai language ancestral to both Hlai and Jiamao) to Proto-Hlai involved the following series of sound changes (Norquest 2007:308). (Order follows that of the table of contents – not intended to be sequential)

 Elimination of Uvulars – loss of Pre-Hlai uvulars *q, *C-q, *C-ɢ
 Intervocalic Lenition – -p- > -ʋ-, -t- > -ɾ-, -k- > -ɦ-, etc.
 Initial Devoicing – loss of voiced fricatives, etc.
 Vocalic Transfer – vowel in penultimate syllable moved to last syllable
 Initial Aspiration
 Monosyllabification – Pre-Hlai, which was sesquisyllabic, was reduced to monosyllabic forms in Proto-Hlai.
 Stop and Fricative Affrication – ʈʰ > tʃʰ, cʰ > tɕʰ, etc.
 Peripheral Vowel Raising – e(ːC) > i(ːC), o(ːC) > u(ːC), ɛː(C) > eː(C), ɔC > oC
 Monophthongization – *ɯa(C) > *ɯə(C) > *ɯː(C), *oːy > *wiː > *iː

Or, in the sequential order given in Norquest (2007:416-417), which excludes monophthongization:
 Intervocalic lenition
 Elimination of uvulars
 Peripheral vowel raising
 Initial devoicing
 Vocalic Transfer
 Initial aspiration
 Monosyllabification
 Stop and fricative affrication

After evolving from Pre-Hlai, Proto-Hlai initials went through 4 main types of sound changes (Norquest 2007:66).
Temporal compression – reduction of constituents in the syllable; most common
Gesture reduction
Onset fortition – change to initial aspiration, etc.
Systemic realignment – mergers, etc.

After the breakup of Proto-Hlai, the following sound changes occurred in various Hlai branches.
Devoicing
Registrogenesis – creation of tone registers (i.e., register splits); most likely influenced by Hainanese Min Chinese

The following table gives the reflexes of the onset consonants in the Hlai languages, as well as Norquest and Ostapirat's reconstructions:

The symbol ↓ indicates here a lowered tone on the following vowel in those Hlai languages where tone split has taken place; this normally occurs following earlier voiced consonants.

See also
Proto-Hlai reconstructions (Wiktionary)
Proto-Tai language
Proto-Kra language
Proto-Austronesian language
Austro-Tai languages

References

Norquest, Peter K. 2007. A Phonological Reconstruction of Proto-Hlai. Ph.D. dissertation. Tucson: Department of Anthropology, University of Arizona.
Norquest, Peter K. 2015. [https://brill.com/view/title/32092 A Phonological Reconstruction of Proto-Hlai]. Languages of Asia, Volume 13. Leiden: Brill. 
Ostapirat, Weera. 2004. "Proto-Hlai Sound System and Lexicons." In Studies on Sino-Tibetan Languages: Papers in Honor of Professor Hwang-cherng Gong on His Seventieth Birthday. Edited by Ying-chin Lin, Fang-min Hsu, Chun-chih Lee, Jackson T.-S. Sun, Hsiu-fang Yang, and Dah-an Ho. Institute of Linguistics. Academia Sinica, Taipei, Taiwan: 121-175.
Matisoff, James. 1988. "Proto-Hlai initials and tones: a first approximation." In Comparative Kadai: Linguistic studies beyond Tai. Edited by Jerold A. Edmondson and David B. Solnit. Summer Institute of Linguistics and The University of Texas at Arlington Publications in Linguistics No. 86: 289-321.
Thurgood, Graham. 1991. "Proto-Hlai (Li): a look at the initials, tones, and finals." In Kadai: Discussions in Kadai and SE Asian Linguistics III: 1-49.
Wu Anqi 吴安其. 2000. "Liyu guyin gouni 黎语古音构拟." In Minzu Yuwen 民族语文 2000(5): 1-13.

Further reading
Miyake, Marc. 2013. The other Kra-Dai numerals (Parts 1, 2).
Miyake, Marc. 2008. Hlai -ɯ.
Miyake, Marc. 2008. Implosives on Hainan. (Parts 1, 2).
Miyake, Marc. 2008. Hlai initial verification.
Miyake, Marc. 2008. Hlai initial glides.
Miyake, Marc. 2008. Hlai palatal codas.

External links
 ABVD: Proto-Hlai word list

Kra–Dai languages
Hlai